KVRC 1240 AM is a radio station licensed to Arkadelphia, Arkansas.  The station is owned by Arkansas Rocks Radio Stations Network.

References

External links

VRC
Classic rock radio stations in the United States